
Tieshan may refer to:

Iron shirt or tieshan, a form of hard-style Chinese martial art
Tsuga chinensis, known as tieshan in Chinese, a coniferous tree species native to China, Taiwan, and Vietnam
Princess Iron Fan or Princess Tieshan, a fictional character from the Chinese novel Journey to the West

Locations in China
Tieshan District, Huangshi, Hubei

Towns
Tieshan, Chongqing
Tieshan, Zhenghe County, Fujian

Townships
Tieshan Township, Heilongjiang, in Qitaihe, Heilongjiang
Tieshan Township, Hunan, in Hongjiang, Hunan
Tieshan Township, Jiangxi, in Shangrao, Jiangxi

Subdistricts
Tieshan Subdistrict, Dalian, Liaoning
Tieshan Subdistrict, Longyan, Fujian
Tieshan Subdistrict, Qingdao, Shandong
Tieshan Subdistrict, Wugang, Henan

See also
Cholsan County, North P'yŏngan province, North Korea